Atlas Eets Christmas is the first album of the rock band the Flaming Lips under their alias Imagene Peise. It is an instrumental Christmas music album that was originally released as a limited edition CD in 2007, and was eventually released in vinyl for the 2014 Boxing Day.

Track listing

References

2007 albums
The Flaming Lips albums